Frank Anthony Vallelonga Sr. (July 30, 1930– January 4, 2013), better known by his stage name Tony Lip, was an American actor. He was best known for his portrayal of crime boss Carmine Lupertazzi in the HBO series, The Sopranos. Lip portrayed real-life Bonanno crime family mobster Philip Giaccone in Donnie Brasco, and real-life Lucchese crime family mobster Francesco Manzo in Goodfellas. It was at the Copacabana nightclub that he first met Francis Ford Coppola and Louis DiGiaimo, leading to a small role in The Godfather, his film debut. He also co-wrote the book Shut Up and Eat! (2005).

His life in the early 1960s, when he was the driver and bodyguard for the black classical pianist Don Shirley, was dramatized in the 2018 film, Green Book, in which he was portrayed by Viggo Mortensen.

Early life 
Frank Anthony Vallelonga was born in Beaver Falls, Pennsylvania, the son of Italian parents, Nazarena and Nicholas Vallelonga. His family moved to the Bronx when he was an infant, and he grew up on 215th Street. He earned the nickname "Lip" in his childhood, as a reference to his reputation for having the ability to talk people into doing things he wanted them to do.

Career 
From 1951 to 1953, he served in the United States Army and was stationed in Germany. He worked at the Copacabana nightclub, starting in 1961, as maître d'hôtel and supervisor.

He was working as a bouncer when he was hired to drive and protect pianist Don Shirley on a tour through the Jim Crow South from 1962 to 1963. This tour is the basis of the 2018 film Green Book, co-written by Lip's son Nick Vallelonga, in which Lip is portrayed by Viggo Mortensen.

Personal life and death 
Lip resided in Paramus, New Jersey, with his wife, Dolores Vallelonga (née Venere), who died in 1999.

Lip died at age 82 on January 4, 2013, in Teaneck, New Jersey. He was survived by his sons, Nick Vallelonga, Frank Vallelonga Jr., brother Rudy Vallelonga, and one grandson.

Filmography 

 The Godfather (1972) – Wedding guest (uncredited)
 Crazy Joe (1974) – Mafia hood (uncredited)
 The Super Cops (1974) – Detroit hitman (uncredited)
 Dog Day Afternoon (1975) – Cop at JFK (uncredited)
 Raging Bull (1980) – Nightclubber (uncredited)
 The Pope of Greenwich Village (1984) – Frankie
 Year of the Dragon (1985) – Lenny Carranza
 Heart (1987) – Max
 Last Rites (1988) – Cabbie
 Lock Up (1989) – Guard
 Goodfellas (1990) – Frankie the Wop
 29th Street (1991) – Nicky Bad Lungs
 Innocent Blood (1992) – Frank
 Law & Order (1992–1996) – Doc / Bobby Murrows
 Who's the Man? (1993) – Vito Pasquale
 A Brilliant Disguise (1994) – Pete
 In the Kingdom of the Blind, the Man with One Eye Is King (1995) – Paulie
 Donnie Brasco (1997) – Philly Lucky
 A Brooklyn State of Mind (1998) – Bartender
 The Sopranos (2001–2007) – Carmine Lupertazzi
 The Signs of the Cross (2005) – Mario
 All In (2006) – Darkman
 Stiletto (2008) – Gus

References

External links 
 
Tony Lip at Find A Grave

1930 births
2013 deaths
Male actors from New Jersey
American male television actors
American people of Italian descent
People of Calabrian descent
People from Paramus, New Jersey
United States Army soldiers
Military personnel from Pennsylvania
Military personnel from New York City
Male actors from New York City
Writers from New York City
American expatriates in Germany